The Wild McCullochs is a 1975 American drama film written and directed by Max Baer Jr. and starring Forrest Tucker, Julie Adams, Max Baer Jr., Janice Heiden, Dennis Redfield and Don Grady. The film was released on May 21, 1975, by American International Pictures.

Plot

Cast        
Forrest Tucker as J.J. McCulloch
Julie Adams as Hannah McCulloch
Max Baer Jr. as Culver Robinson
Janice Heiden as Ali McCulloch
Dennis Redfield as Steven McCulloch
Don Grady as R.J. McCulloch
Chip Hand as Gary McCulloch
William Demarest as Father Gurkin
Harold J. Stone as George
Vito Scotti as Tony
Sandy McPeak as Rad 
Lillian Randolph as Missy
Mike Mazurki as Cliff Randall
Billy Curtis as Charlie P.
Biff Elliot as Ralph
Kenneth Tobey as Larry Carpenter
Doodles Weaver as Pop Holson
Timothy Scott as Pervert
James Gammon as 1st Police Officer
Frederic Downs as Drunk
Joe Sawyers as Toby
Matthew Greene as Al
Mark Hall as Ted

References

External links
 
 Original soundtrack for The McCullochs

1975 films
American drama films
1975 drama films
American International Pictures films
1970s English-language films
1970s American films